Daniel Sénélar (born 24 June 1925 in Paris; died 15 March 2001 in Paris) was a French painter.

Biography 
Presented by Nicolas Untersteller (1900–1967) at the École nationale supérieure des beaux-arts in Paris on 30 October 1947. He first worked under the supervision of Nicolas Untersteller and later under Maurice Brianchon (1899–1979) in 1949.

In 1951 he received the Grand Prix de Rome. He took up residence from 1952 till 1955 at the Villa Medici. under the direction of Jacques Ibert. He became professor at the École des Beaux-Arts in Lille in 1967, a post he held for thirty years.

Works 
His extensive work includes drawings, paintings and graphics. One of his most famous works is the painting "The Horse, Companion of Man" (1951), for which he received the Prix de Rome 1951.

Daniel Sénélar has participated in the restoration works of the Palace of Versailles.
 1950 - Figure peinte (Painted figure)
 1950 - Entraînement des chevaux de course en hiver (Training of the race horses in winter);
 1951 - Le Cheval compagnon de l'homme (The Horse, Companion of Man)
 Fresco at the "Bibliothèque Municipale de Neuilly", now House of Youth at the Place Parmentier in Neuilly
 1952 - Joueurs de cartes dans un salon ou un café (card player in a tearoom or cafe)
 1955 - Le poisson (The Fish), private ownership.

Exhibitions 
 1977 - Picasso Museum at Antibes: the 50 last Grands Prix de Rome

Museums 
 École nationale supérieure des beaux-arts 4 Works.
 Villa Medici in Rome

Awards 
 1950 - Award Albéric Rocheron; First prize and Medal.
 1951 - Grand Prix de Rome 1951 for Le cheval compagnon de l'homme.
 1952 - Fortin d'Ivry Award.

Students 
 Anne Lambert from 1963 to 1968
 Sonia Tamer
 Nathalie Troxler
 Richard-Viktor Sainsily Cayol
 Maria Dubin
 Hugues Absil in 1990
 Marc Anderson (aka André Ronsmac from 1982 to 1989)

Literature 
 Vladimir Velickovic, Daniel Sénélar. Preamble from François Wehrlin: Beaux-Arts 84. École nationale supérieure des Beaux-Arts (Chapelle des Petits Augustins) Paris 1984. .

External links 
 Works of Daniel Sénélar at the École nationale supérieure des beaux-arts in Paris
 "Le cheval compagnon de l'homme" from Daniel Sénélar

References 

20th-century French painters
20th-century French male artists
20th-century French sculptors
French male painters
French male sculptors
Members of the Académie des beaux-arts
Prix de Rome for painting
Academic staff of the École des Beaux-Arts
École des Beaux-Arts alumni
1925 births
2001 deaths